This is a list of 2012 Uzbekistan PFL and 2012 First League transfers in the year 2012 by club. Only transfers of the Uzbek League and First League are provided. Start of the season was March 2012.

Uzbek League

Winter 2023 transfers

FC AGMK

In:

Out:

FK Andijan

In:

Out:

FK Buxoro
In:

Out:

FC Bunyodkor

In:

Out:

Lokomotiv Tashkent

In:

Out:

Metallurg Bekabad

In:

Out:

Nasaf Qarshi

In:

Out:

FK Neftchi Farg'ona

In:

Out:

FK Olympic Tashkent

In:

Out:

FC Pakhtakor Tashkent

In:

Out:

Qizilqum Zarafshon

In:

Out:

FK Samarqand-Dinamo

In:

Out:

FC Sogdiana Jizzakh

In:

Out:

Surkhon Termez

In:

Out:

FK Turon Yaypan

In:

Out:

Summer 2023 transfers

FK Andijan

In:

Out:

FC Bunyodkor

In:

Out:

FK Buxoro

In:

Out:

Lokomotiv Tashkent

In:

Out:

Metallurg Bekabad

In:

Out:

Nasaf Qarshi

In:

Out:

Navbahor Namangan

In:

Out:

Olmaliq FK

In:

Out:

FC Pakhtakor

In:

Out:

Qizilqum Zarafshon

In:
}

Out:

FK Samarqand-Dinamo

In:

Out:

FC Shurtan Guzar

In:

Out:

See also

2023 Uzbekistan Super League
2023 Uzbekistan First League 
2023 Uzbekistan Second League
2023 Uzbekistan Cup 
2023 Uzbekistan League Cup

References

External links 
 Uzbekistan Professional Football League
 2012 Uzbek League winter transfers
 2012 Uzbekistan Professional Football League summer transfers

Transfers
Uzbek
2023
Uzbek